Wilson Island State Recreation Area is a  state recreation area in Harrison County, Iowa, United States, near the city of Missouri Valley. The park, which is named for Iowa governor George A. Wilson, encompasses a forested area along the Missouri River.

The recreation area includes a boat ramp and fishing sites along the river. Fish living in the river include catfish, paddlefish, and walleye. The park is also open to hunting outside of developed areas, with deer and bird hunting being the most popular. Morel mushrooms grow in the recreation area, attracting foragers during the spring months. The park also has  of multi-use trails and a modern campground.

References

State parks of Iowa
Protected areas of Harrison County, Iowa